Seyyed Khan (also Romanized as Seyyed Khān; also known as Seyyed Khān Bar Āhū’ī) is a village in Qorqori Rural District, Qorqori District, Hirmand County, Sistan and Baluchestan Province, Iran. At the 2006 census, its population was 33, in 4 families.

References 

Populated places in Hirmand County